Synthesis is a live album by bassist/composer Reggie Workman. It was recorded on June 15, 1986, in Philadelphia, and was released by Leo Records later that year. On the album, Workman is joined by multi-instrumentalist Oliver Lake, pianist Marilyn Crispell, and drummer Andrew Cyrille. Workman, Lake, and Cyrille would later go to form the group known as Trio 3.

Reception

In an article for The New York Times, Robert Palmer wrote: "The group is an all-star unit... But they don't play like all-stars here, they play like a unit... the music is very free structurally, with a soaring spirit and incantatory qualities that link it to some of the better small-band sessions from the early days of the mid-60's ESP label. But while he leaves plenty of room for each player, Mr. Workman deploys his forces ingeniously... This is stunning music, with a deeply felt intensity and a purity of intent that haven't been finding their way onto jazz records as often as one would like."

The authors of the Penguin Guide to Jazz Recordings awarded the album 3 stars and praised Crispell's playing, stating that she gives "the performance its undoubted sense of coherence."

Writing for AllMusic, Thom Jurek remarked: "As a quartet, this band has some interesting things to say. There is fire in the group interplay and Lake's playing in particular is very inspired... Workman gets considerable credit for putting this ensemble together."

Track listing
All compositions by Reggie Workman unless otherwise noted.

 "Jus' Ole Mae" - 8:00
 "Ogun's Ardor" - 9:27
 "Martyrs Hymn" - 6:19
 "Earthly Garden" - 15:08
 "Chant" (Marilyn Crispell) - 8:35
 "Synapse II" - 9:07
 "Fabula" - 6:49

Personnel 
 Reggie Workman – bass
 Oliver Lake – reeds
 Marilyn Crispell – piano
 Andrew Cyrille – drums

Production
 Leo Feigin – producer
 Kazunori Sugiyama – recording engineer

References

1986 live albums
Leo Records live albums
Reggie Workman live albums